Vice-Admiral Sir Ernest Augustus Taylor, KCMG, CVO (17 April 1876 – 11 March 1971) was a British Royal Navy officer and politician.

In 1898 he married Rose Campbell.

Naval career

Taylor entered HMS Britannia in 1890 and went to sea two years later.  In early May 1902, he was appointed gunnery lieutenant on the pre-dreadnought battleship HMS Renown, serving in the Mediterranean Squadron, and late the same year he was transferred to the armoured cruiser HMS Bacchante on her first commission in the same squadron.

He was assistant to the Director of Naval Ordnance from October 1911 to June 1912. In World War I, he commanded the pre-dreadnought Queen and the light cruiser Birmingham, and served as a flag Captain. He became Captain of the battlecruiser HMS Renown in 1919. With her, he was in 1920 in the entourage for the Prince of Wales's tours of Canada, the USA, Australia and New Zealand.

Political career
He was a member of London County Council from 1925 to 1928.

He was Member of Parliament (MP) for Paddington South from 1930 to 1950.

He won the Paddington South byelection in 1930 as a candidate for the Empire Free Trade Crusade, retaining it in the 1931 General Election.  He joined the Conservative Party after that General election.

References

1876 births
1971 deaths
UK MPs 1929–1931
UK MPs 1931–1935
UK MPs 1935–1945
UK MPs 1945–1950
Conservative Party (UK) MPs for English constituencies
People educated at Stubbington House School
Royal Navy officers of World War I
Royal Navy vice admirals
Knights Bachelor
Knights Commander of the Order of St Michael and St George
Commanders of the Royal Victorian Order
Members of London County Council